This is a list of Brazilian television related events from 1975.

Events

Debuts

Television shows

1970s
Vila Sésamo (1972-1977, 2007–present)

Births
19 March - Alexandre Barillari, actor
25 March - Viviane Araújo, model & actress
5 April - Lisandra Souto, actress
16 April - Flávio Canto, British-born former judoka & TV host
3 June - Cacau Protásio, actress
18 August - Ricardo Tozzi, actor
30 October - Fabiana Karla, actress & comedian

Deaths

See also
1975 in Brazil